Patrick Schmidt (born 17 March 1988) is a German former footballer who played as a midfielder.

References

External links
 

1988 births
Living people
People from Rhein-Hunsrück-Kreis
German footballers
Footballers from Rhineland-Palatinate
Association football midfielders
2. Bundesliga players
3. Liga players
BFV Hassia Bingen players
TuS Koblenz players